Feel Good Now is the second live album by the New York City no wave band Swans. It was recorded on a Sony Professional Walkman on their 1987 Children of God tour in Europe. A remaster of the album, along with the studio album Children of God, was released on November 13, 2020.

Track listing

Notes
 * Left out of the CD release
 ** Merged into one track on the CD release

2002 reissue
The album was reissued by Atavistic Records (ALP135CD) in 2002 having been remastered (according to the liner notes) by Gira at Micromoose Studio, Brooklyn, New York.    The track listing of the reissue is different:

 "Intro"
 "Blind Love" 
 "Like A Drug"
 "Blood and Honey"
 "New Mind"
 "Sex God Sex"
 "Beautiful Child"
 "Blackmail" 
 "Trust Me"
 "Children of God"
 "Beautiful Reprise Backstab"

("Trust Me" does not appear in the track listing on the liner notes)

Personnel
Michael Gira
Jarboe
Norman Westberg
Algis Kizys
Theodore Parsons

Charts

References

External links
Swans official website - Feel Good Now
Atavistic Records page for the 2002 reissue

1988 live albums
Swans (band) live albums
Albums produced by Michael Gira